The 2022 Worcester City Council election took place on 5 May 2022 to elect councillors to Worcester City Council in England.

Results summary

Ward results

Battenhall

Bedwardine

Cathedral

Claines

Gorse Hill

Nunnery

Rainbow Hill

St. John

St. Peter's Parish

Warndon Parish North

Warndon Parish South

Warndon

References

Worcester
2022
2020s in Worcestershire